1992–93 Belarusian First League was the second season of 2nd level football championship in Belarus. It started in August 1992 and ended in June 1993.

Team changes from 1992 season
The winners of last season (Dinamo-2 Minsk) were promoted to Belarusian Premier League, which became possible after they split from their parent team Dinamo Minsk. No teams relegated directly from the Premier League as it was temporary expanded from 16 to 17 teams.

One team that finished at the bottom of 1992 season table (Stankostroitel Smorgon) relegated to the Second League. To compensate for Premier League expansion, they were replaced by two best teams of 1992 Second League (Smena Minsk and Albertin Slonim).

Luch Minsk and Orbita Minsk (who finished 12th and 15th last season) withdrew from the league to amateur lever due to lack of financing. They were replaced by ZLiN Gomel (Second League third-placed team) and Stankostroitel Smorgon (who were spared from relegation).

Before the start of the season Niva Samokhvalovichi changed their name to Niva-Trudovye Rezervy Samokhvalovichi and SKIF-RShVSM to AFViS-RShVSM Minsk. Kolos Ustye was renamed to Kolos-Stroitel Ustye during the winter break.

Overview
Shinnik Bobruisk won the tournament and were promoted the Premier League. Neman Stolbtsy and Stankostroitel Smorgon, who finished 15th and 16th respectively, relegated to the Second League.

Teams and locations

League table

Top goalscorers

See also
1992–93 Belarusian Premier League
1992–93 Belarusian Cup

External links
RSSSF

Belarusian First League seasons
2
2
Belarus